Vladimir Hotineanu (1 October 1950 – 15 November 2019) was a Moldovan surgeon and politician. He was the Health Minister of Moldova in the First Vlad Filat Cabinet, and deputy in Moldovan Parliament from 2014 to 2019.

Biography 

Hotineanu was born on 1 October 1950 in Kyzylorda, Kazakhstan. 

He was a member of the Liberal Democratic Party of Moldova.

References

External links 
 Government of Moldova

 

1950 births
2019 deaths
People from Kyzylorda
Moldovan surgeons
Liberal Democratic Party of Moldova MPs
Moldovan MPs 2009
Moldovan MPs 2009–2010
Moldovan Ministers of Health
Corresponding members of the Academy of Sciences of Moldova
Recipients of the Order of Honour (Moldova)